Scott Spalding (born 2 September 1968) is a former Australian rules footballer who played with Carlton in the Australian Football League (AFL). Originally from Perth in the West Australian Football League (WAFL), Spalding returned to his former club after only one season with the Blues, and another with Port Adelaide in the SANFL, where he played in a premiership and won the Most Consistent Trophy for the Magpies. He later moved to play with East Fremantle, another WAFL club. In 1998, he won a WAFL premiership with East Fremantle, playing alongside his brother, Earl Spalding, also a former Carlton player.

Notes

External links

Scott Spalding's profile at Blueseum

1968 births
Carlton Football Club players
Perth Football Club players
Australian rules footballers from Western Australia
Living people
East Fremantle Football Club players
Port Adelaide Football Club (SANFL) players